Tumegl/Tomils is a village in the municipality of Tomils in the district of Hinterrhein in the Swiss canton of Graubünden.  In 2009 Tumegl/Tomils merged with Feldis/Veulden, Scheid and Trans to form the municipality of Tomils.

History
Tumegl/Tomils is first mentioned in 1141 as in Tumillis.

Geography

Of this area, 34% is used for agricultural purposes, while 55.8% is forested. Of the rest of the land, 5.3% is settled (buildings or roads) and the remainder (5%) is non-productive (rivers, glaciers or mountains).

The village is located in the Domleschg sub-district, of the Hinterrhein district.  It is located on a low terrace on the right bank of the Hinterrhine.  In 2009 Tumegl/Tomils merged with Feldis/Veulden, Scheid and Trans to form the municipality of Tomils.  Until 1943 Tumegl/Tomils was known as Tomils.

Demographics
Tumegl/Tomils has a population of 365, of which 5.2% are foreign nationals.  Over the last 10 years the population has grown at a rate of 7.7%.

, the gender distribution of the population was 51.5% male and 48.5% female.  The age distribution, in Tumegl/Tomils is; 48 people or 15.0% of the population are between 0 and 9 years old.  31 people or 9.7% are 10 to 14, and 26 people or 8.1% are 15 to 19.  Of the adult population, 24 people or 7.5% of the population are between 20 and 29 years old.  55 people or 17.1% are 30 to 39, 52 people or 16.2% are 40 to 49, and 22 people or 6.9% are 50 to 59.  The senior population distribution is 17 people or 5.3% of the population are between 60 and 69 years old, 28 people or 8.7% are 70 to 79, there are 12 people or 3.7% who are 80 to 89, there are 5 people or 1.6% who are 90 to 99, and 1 person or 0.3% who is 100 or more.

In the 2007 federal election the most popular party was the SPS which received 36.8% of the vote.  The next three most popular parties were the SVP (28%), the CVP (21.1%) and the FDP (13.4%).

The entire Swiss population is generally well educated.  In Tumegl/Tomils about 86.6% of the population (between age 25-64) have completed either non-mandatory upper secondary education or additional higher education (either University or a Fachhochschule).

Tumegl/Tomils has an unemployment rate of 0.87%.  , there were 12 people employed in the primary economic sector and about 5 businesses involved in this sector.  14 people are employed in the secondary sector and there are 3 businesses in this sector.  18 people are employed in the tertiary sector, with 8 businesses in this sector.

The historical population is given in the following table:

Languages
Most of the population speaks German (91.3%), with Romansh being second most common ( 4.0%) and Albanian being third ( 2.2%).

Heritage sites of national significance
The S. Maria e Maurezzi Church, Burg Ortenstein (Ortenstein castle) and Sogn Murezi (an early medieval church) are listed as Swiss heritage sites of national significance.

References

External links

 Official website 
 

Former municipalities of Graubünden
Cultural property of national significance in Graubünden
Domleschg

rm:Tumegl